State Route 793 (SR 793) was a state route in the US state of Ohio that served as a connector route from Southeastern Ohio Training Center near Lancaster through Fairfield County to U.S. Route 33 (US 33) in Lancaster. SR 793 was originally designated in 1959. The route was decommissioned in 2006.

Route description
SR 793 began at the Southeastern Ohio Training Center south of Lancaster. From there, the route heads northeast via Broad Street. The highway passed through woodland, before turning towards the north. The highway entered the city of Lancaster. SR 793 terminated at an interchange with US 33, now Memorial Drive.

History
When SR 793 was first introduced into the state route system in 1959, it served as a connector between Southeastern Ohio Training Center near Lancaster and US 33 in Lancaster. The route continued to serve in this capacity until it was removed from the state route system on May 23, 2006.

Major intersections

References

External links

793
Transportation in Fairfield County, Ohio